Les Espions ("The Spies") is a 1957 French-Italian noir mystery film directed by Henri-Georges Clouzot and starring Curd Jürgens, Peter Ustinov O. E. Hasse, Sam Jaffe, Paul Carpenter, Véra Clouzot, Martita Hunt and Gérard Séty,. The music was composed by Georges Auric.

It was shot at the Saint-Maurice in Paris. The film's sets were designed by the art director René Renoux.

Plot
The plot concerns a doctor at a run-down psychiatric hospital, who is offered a large sum of money to shelter a new patient. Soon the place is full of suspicious and secretive characters, all apparently international secret agents trying to find out who and what the patient is.

Cast
 Curd Jürgens as Alex
 Peter Ustinov as Michel Kaminsky
 O. E. Hasse as Hugo Vogel
 Sam Jaffe as Sam Cooper
 Paul Carpenter as Le colonel Howard
 Véra Clouzot as Lucie
 Martita Hunt as Connie Harper
 Gérard Séty as Le docteur Malic
 Gabrielle Dorziat as Madame Andrée - I'infirmière
 Louis Seigner as Valette - le morphinomane 
 Pierre Larquey as Le chauffeur de taxi
 Georgette Anys as La buraliste
 Jean Brochard as Le surveillant-général
 Bernard Lajarrige as Le garçon de café
 Dominique Davray as L'Alsacienne
 Daniel Emilfork as Helmut Petersen - un espion
 Jean-Jacques Lécot as Le faux contrôleur (as Jean-Jacques Lecot)
 Robert Lombard as Le contrôleur 
 Patrick Dewaere as Le petit Moinet (as Patrick Maurin)
 Clément Harari as Victor - le faux garçon de café
 Sacha Pitoëff as Léon (as Sacha Pitoeff)
 Fernand Sardou as Pierre

External links
 
 

1957 films
1950s psychological thriller films
1950s spy films
French spy thriller films
French psychological thriller films
Films directed by Henri-Georges Clouzot
Films scored by Georges Auric
Films with screenplays by Henri-Georges Clouzot
Films set in psychiatric hospitals
Cold War spy films
1950s French films